West Branch Beaver River is a river in Herkimer County, New York that flows into Stillwater Reservoir by Beaver River, New York.

References

Rivers of New York (state)
Rivers of Herkimer County, New York